This is a list of notable architectural design competitions worldwide.

Major architecture competitions by country

Australia
Flinders Street station, Melbourne – Fawcett and Ashworth, 1899 (17 entries)
Shrine of Remembrance, Melbourne – Phillip Hudson and James Wardrop, 1923 (83 entries; open to Australian and British architects only)
Shrine of Remembrance, Brisbane – Buchanan and Cowper, 1928
ANZAC War Memorial, Sydney – Charles Bruce Dellit, 1929 (117 entries)
Opera House, Sydney – Jørn Utzon, 1955 (233 entries)
Parliament House, Canberra – Romaldo Giurgola, 1978 (329 entries)
Federation Square, Melbourne – Lab Architecture Studio, 1997 (177 entries)
Flinders Street station renewal, Melbourne – Hassell + Herzog & de Meuron, 2013 (118 entries)

Austria
Vienna Ring Road – Ludwig Förster – Friedrich August von Stache – Eduard van der Nüll and August Sicard von Sicardsburg, 1858 (85 international participants)
Vienna State Opera – August Sicard von Sicardsburg and Eduard van der Nüll, 1860 
Karlskirche, Vienna – Johann Bernhard Fischer von Erlach, 1713
Votivkirche, Vienna – Heinrich Ferstel, 1854 (75 international participants)
Austrian Postal Savings Bank, Vienna, 1903
City Hall, Innsbruck – Dominique Perrault, 1994

Brazil
City of Brasília – Oscar Niemeyer and Lúcio Costa, 1957 (47 final submissions). The goal was to build a new capital in 1000 days.

Canada
Between 1960 and 2000, close to 150 competitions had been held in Canada.
 City Hall, Toronto – Viljo Revell, 1956 (500 entries)
 University of Manitoba – Visionary (re)Generation, Winnipeg – Janet Roseberg & Studio Inc. with Cibinel Architects Ltd. and Landmark Planning & Design Inc., 2013 (45 international participants)

China
Beijing National Stadium – Herzog & de Meuron, 2001 (13 final submissions).
China Central Television Headquarters – Office for Metropolitan Architecture, 2002 (10 submissions)
Beijing National Aquatics Center – PTW Architects and Arup, 2003 (10 proposals)

Denmark
Royal Danish Library, Copenhagen – Schmidt Hammer Lassen, 1993 (179 entries)
Geo Centre Møns Klint, Møn Island – PLH Architects, 2002 (292 entries)

Egypt
Bibliotheca Alexandrina – Snøhetta, 1998 (523 entries)

Finland
Over the past 130 years, almost 2,000 architectural competitions have been held in Finland.
Central railway station, Helsinki – Eliel Saarinen, 1904 (21 entries)
Viipuri Library – Alvar Aalto, 1927
Paimio Sanatorium – Alvar Aalto, 1929
Säynätsalo Town Hall – Alvar Aalto, 1949
Kiasma Contemporary Art Museum, Helsinki – Steven Holl, 1992 (516 entries)
Guggenheim Helsinki Plan – 2014 (1,715 entries)

France
Opera Garnier, Paris – Charles Garnier, 1861 (171 participants)
Centre Georges Pompidou, Paris – Renzo Piano and Richard Rogers, 1971 (681 entries)
Arab World Institute, Paris – Jean Nouvel, 1981
Parc de la Villette, Paris – Bernard Tschumi, 1982 (471 entries)
La Grande Arche de la Défense, Paris – Johann Otto von Spreckelsen, 1982 (420 entries)
Cité de la Musique, Paris – Christian de Portzamparc, 1983
Opéra Bastille, Paris – Carlos Ott, 1983 (750 entries)
Carré d'Art, Nîmes – Norman Foster, 1984 (12 invited architects)
Opéra National de Lyon, Lyon – Jean Nouvel, 1986

Germany

Reichstag, Berlin, 1872 and 1882 (189 entries by German architects)
Central Station, Hamburg – Heinrich Reinhardt, 1900
House for an Art Lover, Darmstadt, 1901
Berliner Philharmonie, Berlin – Hans Scharoun, 1956–57 (14 invited architects)
Neue Staatsgalerie, Stuttgart – James Stirling, 1977
International Building Exhibition, Berlin – various architects for several projects, 1980–1987
Messeturm, Frankfurt am Main – Helmut Jahn, 1985
Jewish Museum, Berlin Daniel Libeskind, 1989
Commerzbank Tower, Frankfurt am Main – Norman Foster, 1991
Reichstag building, Berlin – Norman Foster, 1992
Central Station, Berlin – Gerkan, Marg and Partners, 1992
Olympic velodrome and swimming pool, Berin – Dominique Perrault, 1992
Felix Nussbaum Museum, Osnabrück – Daniel Libeskind, 1995
French Embassy, Berlin – Christian de Portzamparc, 1997 (7 invited architects)
Phaeno Science Center, Wolfsburg – Zaha Hadid, 2000
BMW Welt, Munich – COOP HIMMELB(L)AU, 2001
BMW Werk, Leipzig – Zaha Hadid, 2002

Ireland
 U2 Tower, Dublin, 2002 (not yet built)

Italy
Termini railway station, Rome, 1947

Japan
 Memorial Cathedral for World Peace, Hiroshima, 1947 (177 designs, no winner)
 Peace Memorial Museum, Hiroshima – Kenzo Tange, 1949 
 New National Theatre, Tokyo – Takahiro Yanagisawa, 1984 
 Tokyo Metropolitan Government Building, Tokyo – Kenzo Tange, 1985–1986
 Kansai International Airport – Renzo Piano, 1988
 Tokyo International Forum, Tokyo – Rafael Viñoly, 1987 (395 entries)

Lithuania
 Vilnius Guggenheim Hermitage Museum – Zaha Hadid – scheduled for completion in 2011

Luxembourg
 Philharmonie Luxembourg – Christian de Portzamparc, 1997

Mexico
 Guggenheim Guadalajara, Guadalajara, Jalisco – Enrique Norten/TEN Arquitectos

Netherlands

Rijksmuseum, Amsterdam – Pierre Cuypers, 1863 and 1875
Beurs, Amsterdam – Hendrik Petrus Berlage, 1884
Peace Palace, The Hague – Louis M. Cordonnier, 1905
Amsterdam City Hall – Wilhelm Holzbauer, Cees Dam, B. Bijvoet and G.H.M. Holt, 1967 (804 entries)
The Hague City Hall – Richard Meier, 1986–1989
Netherlands Architecture Institute, Rotterdam – Jo Coenen, 1988 (6 submissions)

New Caledonia
Jean-Marie Tjibaou Cultural Centre, Nouméa – Renzo Piano, 1991

Norway
Oslo Central Station, Oslo – John Engh

Russia

Palace of Soviets, Moscow – Boris Iofan, 1931–1933, 160 architectural design entries (never built)
Commisariat for Heavy Industry, Moscow, 1934

Spain
Igualada Cemetery, Barcelona – Enric Miralles and Carme Pinós

Sweden
City Hall, Stockholm, 1907

Switzerland
Palace of Nations, Geneva, 1926, Henri Paul Nénot & Julien Flegenheimer; Carlo Broggi; Camille Lefèvre; Giuseppe Vago (377 entries)

United Kingdom

Crystal Palace, London – Joseph Paxton
Houses of Parliament, London – Charles Barry, 1836 (98 proposals)
Royal Courts of Justice, London – George Edmund Street, 1868 (11 competing architects)
Kelvingrove Art Gallery, Glasgow – John William Simpson and E J Milner Allen, 1891 (19 competing architects)
Liverpool Cathedral, Liverpool – Giles Gilbert Scott, 1902 (5 prequalified architects)
McLeod Centre, Iona for the Iona Community – Feilden Clegg Bradley
Manchester Art Gallery – Hopkins Architects, 1994 (132 entries)
Scottish Parliament building, Edinburgh – Enric Miralles, 1998 (5 prequalified architects)
National Assembly for Wales, Cardiff – Richard Rogers, 1998 (55 entries)

United States
 White House, Washington DC – James Hoban, 1792 (9 entries)
 33 Liberty Street, New York – York and Sawyer, 1919
 Tribune Tower, Chicago – John Mead Howells and Raymond Hood, 1922 (260 entries)
 Boston City Hall, Boston – Kallmann McKinnell & Knowles, 1962 (national, 256 entries)
 McCormick Tribune Campus Center, Chicago – Rem Koolhaas, 1998
 New York World Trade Center
 2002 World Trade Center Master Design Contest – Daniel Libeskind (concept)
 World Trade Center Site Memorial Competition – Michael Arad and Peter Walker
 Visual and Performing Arts Library, Brooklyn, NY – Enrique Norten / TEN Arquitectos

References

Sources
De Jong, Cees and Mattie, Erik: Architectural Competitions 1792–1949, Taschen, 1997, 
De Jong, Cees and Mattie, Erik: Architectural Competitions 1950-Today, Taschen, 1997,

External links
 Visionary (re)Generation – Envisioning a Sustainable Campus Community in Winnipeg, Manitoba

 
Design competitions